Hakea cristata, commonly known as the snail hakea, is a shrub in the family Proteaceae  native to Western Australia. An ornamental prickly shrub with attractive foliage and creamy white  rounded flowers appearing in profusion in the winter months.

Description
The leaf margins are toothed and prickly, new growth smooth and an attractive pink-reddish colour. The smooth mid-green leaves have a central vein ending in a stiff sharp point. Each inflorescence is composed of 24-42 faintly scented cream white flowers and appear in upper leaf axils from May to August. The style is smooth. The fruit distinguish this species having  a toothed crest that runs along each side of the underside of the fruit valve ending in a triangular horn at the apex. The surface has spiky toothed ridges, fruit may remain green even at maturity.

Taxonomy and naming
Hakea cristata was first formally described by the botanist Robert Brown in 1830 and published in  Supplementum primum prodromi florae Novae Hollandiae.
The specific epithet  (cristata) is derived from the Latin word cristatus meaning "tufted" or "crested", referring to the crests along each side of the fruit.

Distribution and habitat
The snail hakea is specifically associated with lateritic soils and granite outcrops in the jarrah forests of the Darling Scarp between Chittering and Mundaring. It is usually part of open Eucalyptus wandoo woodland communities.

Notes

References
 Young, J.A. (2006) Hakeas of Western Australia - A Field and Identification Guide page 31

External links
 http://www.anbg.gov.au/abrs/online-resources/flora/stddisplay.xsql?pnid=3219 Flora of Australia Online

Eudicots of Western Australia
cristata
Plants described in 1830
Taxa named by Robert Brown (botanist, born 1773)